The Military ranks of Turkey are the military insignia used by the Turkish Armed Forces.

Turkish Land Forces

Officer ranks

Other ranks

Turkish Air Forces

Officer ranks

Other ranks

Turkish Naval Forces

Officer ranks

Note : Commodores in the Turkish navy are not given special ranks or insignia. In the Turkish navy a commodore is not a rank but a position (usually group commander). Commodores almost always have the rank of Captain (Albay), but can fly their special pennants and wear special ribbons.

Tuğamiral (Rear Admiral/Lower Half) is the lowest admiral's rank. Their shoulderboards are covered in gold lace, and have a silver garland with swords crossed in the middle (General's mark) and a silver five pointed star above that. All admirals also wear two rows of leaves on their caps.
Tümamiral (Rear Admiral/Upper Half) wears the same shoulderboards as Tuğamiral s, but with two silver stars.
Koramiral (Vice Admiral): There are usually six Koramiral s in the whole navy. Koramiral s wear three silver stars on the usual shoulder boards.
Oramiral (Admiral): There are two oramirals, one of them is the Commander of the Naval Forces (Deniz Kuvvetleri Komutanı ), while the other is Commander of the Turkish Fleet (Donanma Komutanı). Oramiral s wear shoulder boards with four silver stars, and three normal stripes (the top one with the curl) above the broad stripe.
Genelkurmay Başkanı (Chief of the Turkish General Staff) assumes command of the Turkish Armed Forces, and although he is commonly appointed from the Turkish Army, he is entitled to wear all uniforms in the Turkish Armed Forces, including the Navy's. When he wears the Navy's uniform, he wears the oramiral's shoulder boards with specially embroidered lace as the base, and he wears the oramiral's sleeve stripes with the broad stripe also embroidered and decorated with leaves.
Büyük Amiral (Admiral of the Fleet): This is a wartime-only rank and has never been awarded to any member of the Turkish Navy. Its army equivalent, Mareşal (Field Marshal), has had only two bearers in the republic's history: Marshal Fevzi Çakmak and Mustafa Kemal Atatürk himself. A Büyük Amiral would wear shoulder boards with special gold handwork on red velvet, decorated with golden leaves, and with a general's garland on top of that.

Rank pennants and flags (ensigns)
Pennants are only flown for officers who assume command of an independent unit. Staff officers who work in headquarters do not fly pennants.

Flandra (Masthead Pennant) : The Flandra is flown when the ship's commanding officer boards the ship. It is quite like a very long red stripe with a crescent moon and star close to the mast.
Group Commander : For group commanders, a red triangular pennant with one bomb (twenty pointed white star) is flown.
Regiment Commanders : For regiment commanders, a square red flag with an anchor in the middle is flown.
Commodores : A swallow-tailed red pennant with two bombs (one on the upper left corner, the other one below that) is flown.

Other ranks

Rates (insignia of category) 
There are several major categories in the Navy for different professions. Insignia of category are worn  right above the circle in the topmost stripe, both on the sleeve and the shoulder board. It is a small round patch with gold-coloured needlework. Line officers and admirals do not wear these patches. (Admirals with special circumstances (doctors and engineers) may wear them on their sleeves, but not shoulders)
Naval Infantry (Marines) : In the Turkish armed forces, marines are subordinates to the navy and wear the Navy's uniforms. Their patch consists of an anchor and two rifles crossing it.
Combat Engineer (Civil Engineer) : A combat engineer wears a patch with the portrayal of what seems to be a fortress, beyond the sea.
Supply : Supply officers wear a branch with three gold-coloured leaves.
Hydrography/Oceanography : These officers wear a patch which portrays a lighthouse, with two beams of light heading away from each other.
Medical Corps (Medical Doctors) : Doctors bear the Staff of Asclepius, a staff with a single snake entangled around it.
Pharmacists : Pharmacists wear the image of a cup, with a snake around it and a branch surrounding both.
Dentists : Dentists wear a staff with a branch around it.
Engineers : An engineer wears the image of a protractor and a pair of compasses beneath that.
Prosecutors/Judges : Officers of this category wear a patch that includes a book laying open and a pair of scales behind that.
Legal : Officers Officers of this category wear a patch that includes a book laying open and a pair of ''H'' above it.
Instructors : Instructors wear a patch with a book laying open with a torch behind.
Band Musician : A band musician wears a patch with a musical harp.
Nurse : Officers from the Nurses’ Corps wear a single golden crescent with the corners pointed upwards.
Intelligence : The Intelligence patch consists of a golden circle with a cross in between;  embroidered with arrows at each point the cross cuts the circle. Portrayed as if this Wheel was turning around its own axis.
Staff Officers : Staff officers, are the officers who assume command or important positions in other headquarters, with a specialty in military personnel and supplies management. They wear a single golden five-point star as their patch of category.

Gendarmerie General Command
Officer ranks

Other ranks

Historic ranks

Notes

References

Bibliography